Richard Adolph Blick (born July 29, 1940) is an American former competition swimmer, Olympic champion, and former world record-holder. He competed in North Central College Swim Club. He later competed at the 1960 Olympic Games in Rome, where he won a gold medal as a member of the first-place U.S. team in the men's 4×200-meter freestyle relay.

Blick taught math and physical education for a number of years at Lynbrook High School in Cupertino California and in Kingsburg, California. He also was the principal in the 80s at Los Gatos Christian; he is now retired with his wife, Shirley, in San Jose, California.

See also
 List of Olympic medalists in swimming (men)
 World record progression 4 × 200 metres freestyle relay

References

External links
 

1940 births
Living people
American male freestyle swimmers
College men's swimmers in the United States
World record setters in swimming
North Central College alumni
Olympic gold medalists for the United States in swimming
Swimmers from Los Angeles
Swimmers at the 1959 Pan American Games
Swimmers at the 1960 Summer Olympics
Medalists at the 1960 Summer Olympics
Pan American Games gold medalists for the United States
People from Kingsburg, California
People from San Jose, California
Pan American Games medalists in swimming
Medalists at the 1959 Pan American Games